Aodh Ua hEidhin (died 1121) was King of Uí Fiachrach Aidhne.

According to the Annals of the Four Masters, sub anno 1121:

 A hosting by Toirdhealbhach son of Ruaidhrí into Munster, and he burned Ciarraighe Luachra and went from there eastwards through Munster, and burned Ua Caoimh's house on the bank of the Abha Mhór, and his scouts came to Magh Ceithniuil and Druim Fínghin. On that day were killed Muireadhach Ua Flaithbheartaigh, king of Iarthar Connacht, and Aodh Ua hEidhin, king of Uí Fhiachrach Aidhne, to avenge the profanation of Mo-Chuda, although Toirdhealbhach made compensation for the plundering. An encampment by Toirdhealbhach son of Ruaidhrí at Magh Biorra during the winter, and he made a settlement between Clann Charthaigh and Síol Briain, and they both submitted to him.

References

 Irish Kings and High-Kings, Francis John Byrne (2001), Dublin: Four Courts Press, 
 CELT: Corpus of Electronic Texts at University College Cork

People from County Galway
1121 deaths
12th-century Irish monarchs
Year of birth unknown